Boca Chica is a municipality (municipio) of the Santo Domingo province in the Dominican Republic. Within the municipality there is one municipal district (distritos municipal): La Caleta. As of the 2012 census it had 123,510 inhabitants, 70,184 living in the city itself and 53,326 in its rural districts (Secciones).

Boca Chica has a popular beach with the same name, located about 30 kilometers east of Santo Domingo de Guzmán in the south-east region of the country.

History
Boca Chica was originally developed by Dominican businessman and politician Juan Bautista Vicini Burgos, who established sugar plantations there in the early 1900s. Vicini was very fond of the place but the golden era of Boca Chica came decades later in the 1950s, when dictator Rafael Leónidas Trujillo ordered the construction of a modern hotel named "Hotel Hamaca", which subsequently became an icon in the area. The hotel became more famous after Trujillo granted political asylum to the dictator Fulgencio Batista after the Cuban Revolution. During the 1950s and the 1960s, prominent families of the Dominican Republic built several summer properties along the beach only accessible by private transportation. 

After the 1970s, the beach became increasingly more popular and public transportation helped to make Boca Chica a very crowded place; it was no longer a secluded beach for the elites as it had been during the '50s and '60s. The Hamaca hotel was closed after Hurricane David in 1979, and it remained closed and abandoned for more than twenty years which caused an economic decline in the area. It was reopened in the early 1990s, and the public beach remains popular among people of the lower working classes.

Geography
Boca Chica's proximity to the city of Santo Domingo, its clear blue waters and white sand have made it one of the busiest beaches in the Dominican Republic, especially on weekends and holidays, because it is 30 km away from Santo Domingo. Boca Chica has two small islands Los Pinos, which were made with sand from the dredging of the Andrés port in the 1950s and La Matica and La Piedra, mangrove cays, submerged vascular plants and habitat for various species of birds. The beach has a natural breakwater, as well as a fresh water spring, coming from the Brujuelas underground river.

Characteristics

The short distance from the capital city (19 miles), the crystalline waters and the white sands turned Boca Chica into the most crowded beach of the Dominican Republic, especially on weekends and holidays. Boca Chica beach has immaculate fine sand. You can walk in the water and the depth will barely change, the water will be to your waist (or a little bit over) all the time. Boca Chica has two small islands, Los Pinos and La Matica, and two marinas.

There are several bars, restaurants, pizza stands, souvenirs stalls and loud music throughout most of the day; all this along the beach sand very close to the shore. In the evening, Boca Chica transforms itself into a town of party bars.

Notable people
Cristian Javier, Houston Astros pitcher
Jeurys Familia, New York Mets pitcher
Elvis Luciano, MLB pitcher for the Toronto Blue Jays

References
Notes

External links

Online guide to Boca Chica
 Boca Chica; Santo Domingos Badewanne

Populated places in Santo Domingo Province
Municipalities of the Dominican Republic
Beaches of the Dominican Republic
Tourist attractions in Santo Domingo Province